Dante Deneen Washington (born November 21, 1970, in Baltimore, Maryland) is an American former soccer player who played as a striker.

Washington played college soccer at Radford University, and was named a first team All-American in 1991. He is the NCAA career leader for assists in men's soccer.

Playing career
After years in the various indoor leagues and minor outdoor leagues, he signed with MLS and the Columbus Crew midway through the inaugural 1996 season. But after only three games with the club, Dante was traded to the Dallas Burn for the rights to Brad Friedel. Washington spent the next three and a half seasons in Dallas, his best being in 1997, when he scored 12 goals. In 2000, it was off to Columbus again, traded for a draft pick. Washington scored 15 in his first season back with the Crew, but his production declined during the next two seasons and he wasn't re-signed in 2003.

Washington would spend the next two years with the Virginia Beach Mariners of the A-League. In 2004, he led the league in scoring and tied for the lead in goals. At the end of the year, Dante received a surprise call-up to the Crew and started a playoff game over the befuddled regular starter Edson Buddle. He stayed with the club through the opening of the 2005 season, but was let go when Columbus acquired Cornell Glen. He was then acquired by Real Salt Lake, in exchange for salary budget considerations sent to Columbus. In nine years of MLS play, Washington scored 52 league goals and added 30 assists.  He retired from MLS following the 2005 season, but later signed with the Baltimore Blast of the MISL.  Washington had played for a few years prior to his stint in the MLS with the Washington Warthogs in the CISL.

Washington played for the United States in the 1992 Summer Olympics. He earned a total of six caps for the senior team, the first coming on March 12, 1991 against Mexico. He scored on his debut and added one other goal for his country.

Washington is one of 22 college players to be part of the 40-40 club, having both 40 goals and 40 assists in their college career.

Honors

Club
Dallas Burn
Lamar Hunt U.S. Open Cup: 1997
Columbus Crew
Lamar Hunt U.S. Open Cup: 2002

Individual
A-League Top Scorer: 2004

References

1970 births
Living people
All-American men's college soccer players
African-American soccer players
American soccer players
Association football commentators
Association football forwards
Baltimore Blast (2001–2008 MISL) players
Columbus Crew players
Continental Indoor Soccer League players
FC Dallas players
Footballers at the 1992 Summer Olympics
Major Indoor Soccer League (2001–2008) players
Major League Soccer players
Olympic soccer players of the United States
Radford Highlanders men's soccer players
Real Salt Lake players
Soccer players from Baltimore
United States men's international soccer players
USL First Division players
Virginia Beach Mariners players
Washington Warthogs players
Major League Soccer All-Stars
United States men's under-23 international soccer players
21st-century African-American sportspeople
20th-century African-American sportspeople
Pan American Games gold medalists for the United States
Pan American Games medalists in football
Medalists at the 1991 Pan American Games
Footballers at the 1991 Pan American Games